Arnstein is a town in the Mansfeld-Südharz district, Saxony-Anhalt, Germany. It was formed on 1 January 2010 by the voluntary merger of twelve former municipalities. Its mayor is Frank Sehnert.

Geography

Subdivisions 
The town of Arnstein is divided into twelve localities (Ortschaften), corresponding to the twelve former municipalities which now constitute the town. Some of the localities consist of a number of Ortsteile (local parts).

History 

Arnstein was created on 1 January 2010 by the voluntary merger of twelve former municipalities in the Mansfeld-Südharz district. The new unified entity took its name from the old administrative unit of Amt Arnstein in the County of Mansfeld and the Arnstein Castle.

Notable people 

 Christian August Friedrich Garcke: botanist and scientific author
 Andreas Gottlieb Hoffmann: Protestant theologian and Orientalist
 Georg Philipp Friedrich Freiherr von Hardenberg: aristocrat, poet, author, mystic and philosopher of Early German Romanticism known by pen name "Novalis"

References

 
Mansfeld-Südharz